Jaka Corn (born 14 April 1995) is a football midfielder from Slovenia. His current club is Ilirija 1911.

References

External links
Player profile at PrvaLiga 

1995 births
Living people
Slovenian footballers
Association football midfielders
NK Olimpija Ljubljana (2005) players
ND Ilirija 1911 players
Slovenian PrvaLiga players
Slovenian Second League players
Slovenia youth international footballers